The Juggernauts is a Big Finish Productions audio drama based on the long-running British science fiction television series Doctor Who.

Plot
To escape the destruction of a medical vessel the Sixth Doctor sends his red-headed companion Melanie Bush out in an escape pod, promising to seek her out once he rescues his TARDIS from the exploding ship. However, on finding his ship he is trapped in a Dalek time scoop. Mel, however, lands on the planet Lethe where her skills as a computer technician are keenly sought, and she joins a team led by the wheelchair-using Dr. Vaso and works to create the Juggernauts: "the ultimate service robots". She becomes quite attached to the team (catching the eye of the juvenile but intelligent Geoff) and particularly the elderly Vaso, with whom she strikes up a rapport.

The Doctor however, discovers himself employed by the Daleks to spy on the situation on Lethe. He agrees; for they threaten Mel's life. What is the secret of the Juggernauts? Why are the Daleks interested in Lethe? What are the strange things residing in the darkness of the lower echelons of the colony?

Cast
The Doctor — Colin Baker
Mel Bush — Bonnie Langford
Davros — Terry Molloy
Sonali — Bindya Solanki
Geoff — Klaus White
Kryson — Peter Forbes
Brauer — Paul Grunert
Loewen — Julia Houghton
Dalek/Mechonoid Voices — Nicholas Briggs

Notes
The Mechonoids previously appeared in the television story The Chase.
Davros uses the alias of "Dr Vaso", an anagram of his real name. Another Doctor Who villain, the Master, has a similar habit for assuming aliases which are anagrams (or other derivations) of "Master".
For Davros, the events depicted here take place between The Curse of Davros and the Seventh Doctor television story Remembrance of the Daleks.
At the end of The Juggernauts, Davros is in an explosion. In Remembrance, a new and more elaborate chariot has been designed for him.
In the television story Revelation of the Daleks, Davros' only remaining hand was shot and destroyed.  In this audio, he has replaced it with a cybernetic hand, which would tie this story in with "The Stolen Earth"/"Journey's End" where he also has a cybernetic hand.
In part two Mel refers to her co-workers as Sooty, Sweep and Soo a reference to the long running children's puppet show.
The planet Mel finds herself on is called Lethe. Lethe was also the name of the Greek spirit of forgetfulness and oblivion.

External links
Big Finish Productions – The Juggernauts

2005 audio plays
Sixth Doctor audio plays
Davros audio plays
Dalek audio plays